The 1991–92 BYU Cougars men's basketball team represented Brigham Young University in the 1991–92 basketball season. Led by head coach Roger Reid, the Cougars won their second consecutive WAC title, and made their second tournament appearance under Reid. In the NCAA tournament, the Cougars were defeated by LSU in the first round to finish with an overall record of 25–7 (12–4 WAC).

Roster

Schedule and results

|-
!colspan=9 style=| Regular season

|-
!colspan=9 style=| WAC Tournament

|-
!colspan=9 style=| NCAA Tournament

References

BYU Cougars men's basketball seasons
Byu
Byu
Byu Cougars Men's Basketball
Byu Cougars Men's Basketball